This article is a list of historic places in rural municipalities of the province of Saskatchewan entered on the Canadian Register of Historic Places, whether they are federal, provincial, or municipal.

List of historic places

See also 

 List of National Historic Sites of Canada in Saskatchewan
 List of historic places in Saskatchewan

Rural municipalities